Lalova is a commune in Rezina District, Moldova. It is composed of three villages: Lalova, Nistreni and Țipova.

Gallery

References

Communes of Rezina District
Populated places on the Dniester